Anthony Thomas Betts (born 31 October 1953) is an English former footballer who played as a forward. He played in the Football League, the North American Soccer League, and the Major Indoor Soccer League.

He began his career at Aston Villa, featuring in the 1972 FA Youth Cup final. He was loaned out to Southport in 1974–75, before he emigrated to America to play for the Portland Timbers. He helped the Timbers to the final of the Soccer Bowl in 1975, before briefly returning to England with Port Vale and Boldmere St. Michael's. He returned to Portland Timbers for two more seasons, before joining the Minnesota Kicks in 1979. He then spent the last three years of his career with indoor football club Buffalo Stallions.

Career
Betts started his career as a professional at Aston Villa in March 1972 and played for the "Villans" in the 1972 FA Youth Cup final win over Liverpool, playing alongside players such as John Gidman, Alan Little, and Brian Little. He made four Second Division appearances at Villa Park under the stewardship of Ron Saunders. He was loaned out to Alan Ball's Southport of the Fourth Division, scoring once in eight league appearances in the 1974–75 campaign. His contract with Aston Villa was cancelled in April 1975.

He moved to the United States to play for the Portland Timbers in 1975, who were managed by former Villa manager Vic Crowe. He scored seven goals in 18 games, helping the Timbers to the top of the Western Conference of the North American Soccer League. He scored the golden goal in extra-time for Portland in a memorable play-off victory against archival Seattle Sounders on 12 August. They went on to play Soccer Bowl '75, but lost 2–0 to the Tampa Bay Rowdies at Spartan Stadium.

He had a trial with Roy Sproson's Port Vale in September 1975, and started for a 2–1 Third Division defeat at Gillingham on 11 October 1975. He was let go in November that year without making another appearance in 1975–76. He briefly played for Boldmere St. Michael's in the Midland Football Combination, before returning to the Civic Stadium in 1976. He scored five goals in 24 games, becoming the club's top scorer. Betts was retained by new manager Brian Tiler for the 1977 season, though scored just once in 24 games, in a disappointing campaign for the Timbers.

Betts played for the Minnesota Kicks of the North American Soccer League in 1979, gaining one assist in his only appearance at the Metropolitan Stadium for Roy McCrohan's side. The Kicks won the Central Division, but were defeated by the Tulsa Roughnecks in the play-offs. He then moved on to the Buffalo Memorial Auditorium to play for the Buffalo Stallions of the Major Indoor Soccer League. He scored four goals in 29 games in 1979–80, as the Stallions were beaten by the Pittsburgh Spirit in the first round of the play-offs. He scored seven goals in 32 appearances in 1980–81, as the Stallions again were beaten at the first stage of the play-offs, this time by the St. Louis Steamers. He scored two goals in nine games in 1981–82 as Buffalo again lost at the first stage of the play-offs, this time being beaten by the New York Arrows. He retired after undergoing knee surgery in 1982.

Post-retirement
After retiring he settled in the Portland area and founded the West Villa Soccer Club. At the turn of the millennium he was working as an independent sales rep, selling sports shoes.

Career statistics
Source:

Honours
Aston Villa
FA Youth Cup: 1972

Portland Timbers
North American Soccer League Western Conference: 1975
Soccer Bowl runner-up: 1975

Minnesota Kicks
North American Soccer League Central Division: 1979

References

1953 births
Living people
Footballers from Derby
English footballers
England youth international footballers
England amateur international footballers
Association football forwards
Aston Villa F.C. players
Southport F.C. players
English expatriate footballers
English expatriate sportspeople in the United States
Expatriate soccer players in the United States
Portland Timbers (1975–1982) players
Port Vale F.C. players
Boldmere St. Michaels F.C. players
Minnesota Kicks players
Buffalo Stallions players
North American Soccer League (1968–1984) players
Major Indoor Soccer League (1978–1992) players
English Football League players